Spring Garden School is a public K-8 school in the Poplar neighborhood of Philadelphia, Pennsylvania. It is a part of the School District of Philadelphia.

The historic school building originally housed Spring Garden School No. 2. It was designed by Irwin T. Catharine and built in 1930–1931.  It is a three-story, 16 bay orange brick building in the Art Deco-style. It features corbelled brick pilasters with capitals adorned by floral motifs and a caged rooftop play area.

It was added to the National Register of Historic Places in 1986.

The Spring Garden attendance boundary includes a portion of the Center City District just north of the traditional boundary of Center City. Residents zoned to Spring Graden are zoned to Benjamin Franklin High School.  over 70% of students who graduate from Spring Garden instead go to special admission and magnet schools such as Bodine High School for International Affairs, Carver High School for Science and Engineering, Constitution High School, Parkway High School, and Philadelphia High School for Girls.

History

In 2015 a parent who participated in a lawsuit against the Commonwealth of Pennsylvania stated that the school nurse at Spring Garden only appears once per week, and that the school had been forced to end its Spanish as a second language program.

The school has been abandoned since 1986.

In October 2017, efforts were made by Help USA (a nonprofit organization investing in supportive and housing services) to assist homeless Philadelphia veterals and includes 12 and an additional 37 housing units for low-income seniors.

References

External links
 Spring Garden School
 

School buildings on the National Register of Historic Places in Philadelphia
Art Deco architecture in Pennsylvania
School buildings completed in 1931
Poplar, Philadelphia
Public K–8 schools in Philadelphia
School District of Philadelphia